Alejandro Américo «Álex» Pereira Amorim (born 15 January 1977) is a retired footballer who played as a central defender.

He spent his entire professional career in Spain, with Sporting de Gijón and Recreativo.

Football career
The son of a Venezuelan father and a Portuguese mother, Pereira was born in Caracas and moved with his family to Spain in his teens, settling in Asturias. His first club was lowly UP Langreo, for which he played one season in the third division.

In 1998, Pereira signed for neighbouring Sporting de Gijón, but appeared rarely for the first team during his spell, only collecting ten second level appearances. After three years he joined fellow league side Recreativo de Huelva, experiencing his best season as a professional in his debut campaign as the Andalusians returned to La Liga after a 24-year absence (26 games played).

In 2002–03, Pereira appeared in 15 matches – all starts – as Recre was immediately relegated back. After no appearances in the 2004–05 season, due to injury, he retired from football at the age of only 28.

References

External links

1977 births
Living people
Venezuelan people of Portuguese descent
Footballers from Caracas
Portuguese footballers
Venezuelan footballers
Association football defenders
La Liga players
Segunda División players
Segunda División B players
UP Langreo footballers
Sporting de Gijón B players
Sporting de Gijón players
Recreativo de Huelva players
Portuguese expatriate footballers
Venezuelan expatriate footballers
Expatriate footballers in Spain
Portuguese expatriate sportspeople in Spain
Venezuelan expatriate sportspeople in Spain